Joseph Crespo (Elne, 1 January 1925 - Mably, 15 July 2011) was a French rugby union and rugby league player who represented France in the 1951 French rugby league tour of Australia and New Zealand and 1954 World Cup.

Career
Crespo started to play rugby union for USA Perpignan, with which he became1943-44 French Rugby Union Championship French Champion in 1944. In the same year, he returned to play rugby league, which was forbidden by the Vichy regime between 1941 and 1944, joining RC Roanne XIII and later for Lyon Villeurbanne XIII. He earned 26 caps for France, between 1948 and 1954, taking part to the 1951 French rugby league tour of Australia and New Zealand and the 1954 World Cup. During his active life, he worked as sales rep for home improvement articles.

References

1925 births
2011 deaths
France national rugby league team players
French rugby league players
Lyon Villeurbanne XIII players
RC Roanne XIII players
Rugby league centres
Rugby league halfbacks
Sportspeople from Pyrénées-Orientales
French rugby union players
USA Perpignan players